The 19575/19576 Okha - Nathdwara Express is an express train belonging to Western Railway zone that runs between Okha and Nathdwara in India. It is currently being operated with 19575/19576 train numbers on a weekly basis.

Service

The 19575/Okha - Nathdwara Express has an average speed of 51 km/hr and covers 1137 km in 22 hrs 20 mins.

The 19576/Nathdwara - Okha Express has an average speed of 49 km/hr and covers 1137 km in 23 hrs 10 mins.

Schedule

Route and halts 

The important halts of the train are:

Coach composite

The train has standard ICF rakes with max speed of 110 kmph. The train consists of 17 coaches :

 1 AC II Tier
 2 AC III Tier
 6 Sleeper Coaches
 6 General Unreserved
 2 Seating cum Luggage Rake

Traction

Both trains are hauled by a Vatva Loco Shed based WDM 3A diesel locomotive from Okha to Ahmedabad. From Ahmedabad trains are hauled by a Vadodara Loco Shed based WAP-4E electric locomotive uptil Ratlam. From Ratlam trains are hauled by a Ratlam Loco Shed based WDM 3A diesel locomotive uptil Nathdwara and vice versa.

Rake Sharing 

The train shares its rake with 22939/22940 Hapa - Bilaspur Superfast Express.

Direction Reversal

Train reverses its direction at:

Notes

See also 

 Okha railway station
 Nathdwara railway station
 Hapa - Bilaspur Superfast Express

References

External links 

 19575/Okha - Nathdwara Express
 19576/Nathdwara - Okha Express

Transport in Okha
Express trains in India
Rail transport in Rajasthan
Rail transport in Madhya Pradesh
Rail transport in Gujarat
Railway services introduced in 2013